Kiryonti (Yaghnobi: Кирёнтӣ,  Kiryonte) is a village in Sughd Region, northwestern Tajikistan. It is part of the Jamoat Anzob in the Ayni District. Its population was 107 in 2007.

References

Populated places in Sughd Region
Yaghnob